The 1933 LSU Tigers football team represented Louisiana State University (LSU) in the 1933 college football season.  This was LSU's first season as a member of the Southeastern Conference. Halfback Abe Mickal led the team in scoring.

Schedule

Season summary

Vanderbilt
For homecoming, LSU tied Vanderbilt 7–7. The champion 1908 team was honored.

Award winners
All-SEC
Players selected by the Associated Press (AP) or United Press (UP) for the 1933 All-SEC football team:
 Jack Torrance, tackle (first-team AP, UP)
 Abe Mickal, halfback (second-team UP)

References

LSU
LSU Tigers football seasons
College football undefeated seasons
LSU Tigers football